Suzy may refer to:

Arts and entertainment
 Suzy (film), a 1936 film starring Jean Harlow, Franchot Tone and Cary Grant
 "Suzy" (Fool's Garden song), a song by German pop band Fool's Garden 
 "Suzy", a song by French electro swing band Caravan Palace
 Suzy Turquoise Blue, character in The Keys to the Kingdom by Garth Nix
 one of the title characters of Spike and Suzy, a Belgian comics series

People
 Suzy (given name)
 Bae Suzy or Suzy, stage name of Bae Soo-ji (born 1994), a South Korean singer and member of girl group Miss A
 Aileen Mehle (1918–2016), American newspaper and magazine columnist who wrote under the bylines "Suzy" and "Suzy Knickerbocker"
 Suzy (singer) (born 1980), Portuguese singer
 Suzy (footballer), Brazilian footballer Suzy Bittencourt de Oliveira

Other uses
 Suzy, Aisne, a commune in northern France
 Suzy (record label), a record label in Croatia

See also
 Susie (disambiguation)
 Susi (disambiguation)
 Susy (disambiguation)
 Suzie (disambiguation)
 Suzi (disambiguation)
 Suji (disambiguation)